Major General Guy Patrick Gregson,  (8 April 1906 – 10 December 1988) was a British Army officer who served General Officer Commanding of the 1st Infantry Division from 1956 to 1959.

Military career
Educated at Gresham's School and the Royal Military Academy, Woolwich, Gregson was commissioned into the Royal Artillery in 1925 and saw active service in the Second World War in the rank of lieutenant colonel. He was mentioned in despatches twice and received the Military Cross, the Distinguished Service Order and Bar and the Croix de Guerre. Promoted to brigadier in 1950, he served in the Korean War and was appointed a Commander of the Order of the British Empire in 1953. He was made General Officer Commanding 1st Infantry Division in 1956 and Regional Director of Civil Defence for the UK's Eastern Region in 1960 before retiring in 1968.

In 1945, Gregson married Oriel Leonie Lucas-Scudamore in Sherman, Connecticut. They divorced and he remarried Iris Slade-Powell.

References

1906 births
1988 deaths
People educated at Gresham's School
Graduates of the Royal Military Academy, Woolwich
Royal Artillery officers
British Army major generals
British Army personnel of World War II
Recipients of the Military Cross
Companions of the Order of the Bath
Commanders of the Order of the British Empire
British Army personnel of the Korean War
South African military personnel
Companions of the Distinguished Service Order